Pescarolo may refer to:

 Henri Pescarolo, a French Formula One, sports car, and rally driver
 Pescarolo Sport, the French motorsports team founded by Henri Pescarolo
 Juliano Pescarolo Martins (born 1974), Brazilian footballer
 Pescarolo ed Uniti, an Italian comune in the Province of Cremona